Bayg District is a district (bakhsh) in Torbat-e Heydarieh County, Razavi Khorasan Province, Iran. At the 2006 census, its population was 8,327, in 2,465 families.  The District has one city: Bayg. The District has one rural district (dehestan): Bayg Rural District.

References 

Districts of Razavi Khorasan Province
Torbat-e Heydarieh County